Sidi Ghrib is a Tunisian archaeological site about forty kilometers south-west of Carthage and four kilometers from Borj El Amri, known for its beautiful Roman mosaics .

Archaeology

The site was searched in 1975. The study by Abdelmajid Ennabli showed that the site was a Roman villa of  the late 4th or early 5th century. The thermal baths at the site formed part of the villa and were therefore private.  With a total area of 780 m 2, they measure 28 by 29 meters, around a frigidarium of about 8.5 meters by 9.5 meters.

Description of the mosaics 
 Matron at his toilet, displayed at the National Museum of Bardo, is a mosaic representing the domina, the mistress of house, occupied with her toilet and surrounded by two maidservants of which one holds a mirror and the other carries a basket containing various jewels. At the end of the mosaic, the artist presented the necessary accessories for the bath: a pair of sandals, a basket of linen, a pitcher, etc.; 
 Master of the house leaving for the hunting exhibition at the presidential palace of Carthage. 

These representations with the aim of social affirmation are frequent at the end of antiquity .

References

Roman mosaics